Armando Carlini (9 August 1878 – 30 September 1959)
was an Italian philosopher and author.

He was born in Naples, Italy. Carlini was a follower of the Fascist philosopher Giovanni Gentile. In 1922 he replaced Gentile in the chair of theoretical philosophy
at the University of Pisa. He died in Pisa, Italy.

References

1878 births
1959 deaths
20th-century Italian philosophers
Italian fascists
Members of the Royal Academy of Italy
Academic staff of the University of Pisa